Cristian Ristea  (born February 9, 1992) is a Romanian professional kickboxer, currently competing in the heavyweight division. He is the current GFC Intercontinental Heavyweight Champion.

Ristea is ranked the #2 light heavyweight in the world by Enfusion Live. As of May 2020, Ristea is ranked the #5 heavyweight in the world by Enfusion Live.

Kickboxing career
Ristea fought Florent Kaouachi for the vacant ISKA World Heavyweight K1 title. Kaouachi won the fight by a fourth round TKO.

He fought Vladimir Toktasynov during the OSS Fighter 4 event. Ristea won the fight by a unanimous decision.

Ristea fought Jürgen Dolch during Mix Kombat 5. He won the fight by TKO, after knocking Dolch down three times in the first round.

Ristea took part in the 2020 OSS Fighters Heavyweight tournament. In the quarter finals he knocked Thomas Froschauer out with a right hook. In the semifinals he defeated Marco Pisu by a unanimous decision. Ristea lost the final bout to Fabio Kwasi by a third round TKO.

Ristea was scheduled to fight Pavel Zhuravlev at FEA: Reset on March 13, 2021, for the FEA Heavyweight title. However, Zhuravlev pulled out of the fight citing a bicep injury. He was replaced by Kirill Kornilov. Kornilov won the fight by a second-round knockout.

Championships and accomplishments
Golden Fighter Championship
GFC Intercontinental Heavyweight Championship (One time, current)
OSS Fighters
OSS Fighters 05 Heavyweight Tournament Runner Up
Local Kombat
Local Kombat National Light Heavyweight Plus Championship (One time)
Dynamite Fighting Show  
Fight of the Night (One time) vs. Thomas Froschauer

Professional kickboxing record

|- 
|-  bgcolor="#CCFFCC" 
| 2022-10-19 || Win ||align=left| Florin Matei || Dynamite Fighting Show 16 || Iași, Romania || Decision (unanimous) || 3
|-
|-  bgcolor="#CCFFCC" 
| 2022-09-10 || Win ||align=left| Ionuț Iancu || Best of the Best 1 || Brăila, Romania || Decision (split) || 5
|-
! style=background:white colspan=9 |
|-
|-  bgcolor="#FFBBBB"
| 2022-07-22 || Loss ||align=left| Florin Ivănoaie || Clash of the Titans 24 || Târgoviște, Romania || TKO (towel thrown) || 4
|-
|-  bgcolor="#CCFFCC" 
| 2022-06-20 || Win ||align=left| Kaan Murat İnanır || KO Masters 10 || Bucharest, Romania || TKO (towel thrown) || 1
|-
|-  bgcolor="#FFBBBB"
| 2021-11-19 || Loss ||align=left| Kevin Tariq Osaro || OSS Fighters 07 || Constanța, Romania || Decision (unanimous) || 3
|-
|-  bgcolor="#CCFFCC" 
| 2021-11-01 || Win ||align=left| Mustafa Al-Taslaq || Superkombat Universe || Dubai, UAE || Decision (unanimous) || 3
|- 
|-  bgcolor="#CCFFCC" 
| 2021-08-17 || Win ||align=left| Muhammed Balli || KO Masters 9 || Bucharest, Romania || Decision (unanimous) || 3
|-
|-  bgcolor="#CCFFCC" 
| 2021-07-16 || Win ||align=left| Nico Pereira Horta || OSS Fighters 06 || Constanța, Romania || Decision (split) || 3
|-
|-  bgcolor="#FFBBBB"
| 2021-03-13 || Loss ||align=left| Kirill Kornilov || FEA World GP: Reset || Chișinău, Moldova || KO (right hook) ||  2
|-
! style=background:white colspan=9 | 
|- 
|-  bgcolor="#FFBBBB"
| 2020-02-07 || Loss ||align=left| Fabio Kwasi || OSS Fighters 05, Final || Bucharest, Romania || TKO (referee stoppage) ||  3
|-
! style=background:white colspan=9 |
|-
|-  bgcolor="#CCFFCC" 
| 2020-02-07 ||  Win ||align=left| Marco Pisu || OSS Fighters 05, Semi Finals || Bucharest, Romania || Decision (unanimous) || 3
|-  bgcolor="#CCFFCC" 
| 2020-02-07 || Win ||align=left| Thomas Froschauer || OSS Fighters 05, Quarter Finals || Bucharest, Romania || KO (right hook) || 2  
|-  bgcolor="#CCFFCC" 
| 2019-12-07 || Win ||align=left| Jürgen Dolch || Mix Kombat 5 || Bistrița, Romania || TKO (referee stoppage/3 knockout rule) || 1
|-  bgcolor="#CCFFCC" 
| 2019-11-21 || Win ||align=left| Thomas Froschauer || Dynamite Fighting Show 6 || Iași, Romania || Decision (split) || 3
|-  bgcolor="#FFBBBB"
| 2019-10-05 || Loss ||  || Battle Arena Series || Waregem, Belgium || TKO (eye injury) || 2
|-  bgcolor="#CCFFCC" 
| 2019-08-22 || Win ||align=left| Vladimir Toktasynov || OSS Fighters 04 || Mamaia, Romania || Decision (unanimous) || 3 
|-  bgcolor="#CCFFCC" 
| 2019-06-06 || Win ||align=left| Eldar Oliveira || Dynamite Fighting Show 4 || Cluj-Napoca, Romania || Decision (unanimous) || 3
|-  bgcolor="#FFBBBB"
| 2019-04-13 || Loss ||align=left| Nidal Bchiri || Enfusion #82 || Orchies, France || Decision || 3
|-  bgcolor="#CCFFCC" 
| 2019-02-28 || Win ||align=left| Yurii Chornoivanenko || OSS Fighters 03 || Bucharest, Romania || Decision || 3 
|-  bgcolor="#FFBBBB"
| 2018-10-27 || Loss ||align=left| Кirill Kornilov || Tatneft Cup 2018, Semi Finals || Kazan, Russia || Decision || 4
|-  bgcolor="#CCFFCC" 
| 2018-08-24 || Win ||align=left| Аdel Zaripov || Tatneft Cup 2018 || Kazan, Russia || TKO (referee stoppage/3 knockdown rule) || 1
|-  bgcolor="#CCFFCC" 
| 2018-07-05 || Win ||align=left| Miroslav Vujović || Dynamite Fighting Show 1 || Bucharest, Romania || Decision (split) || 3
|-  bgcolor="#FFBBBB"
| 2018-05-31 || Loss ||align=left| Igor Darmeshkin || Tatneft Cup 2018 || Kazan, Russia || Decision || 4
|-  bgcolor="#FFBBBB"
| 2018-02-24 || Loss ||align=left| Florent Kaouachi || K1 Event 11 || Troyes, France || TKO || 4
|-
! style=background:white colspan=9 |
|-
|-  bgcolor="#FFBBBB"
| 2017-09-06 || Loss ||align=left| Aleksandr Grinchuk || Tatneft Cup 2017 || Kazan, Russia || TKO (referee stoppage/punches) || 4
|-  bgcolor="#FFBBBB"
| 2017-05-06 || Loss ||align=left| Dawid Żółtaszek || SUPERKOMBAT World Grand Prix II 2017 || Madrid, Spain || KO (punches) || 2
|-  bgcolor="#CCFFCC" 
| 2017-04-07 || Win ||align=left| Dawid Żółtaszek || SUPERKOMBAT World Grand Prix I 2017 || Bucharest, Romania || Extra round decision || 4
|-  bgcolor="#CCFFCC" 
| 2017-03-22 || Win ||align=left| Gordon Haupt || Tatneft Cup 2017 || Kazan, Russia || Decision || 3 
|-  bgcolor="#FFBBBB"
| 2016-05-07 || Loss ||align=left| Dănuț Hurduc|| SUPERKOMBAT World Grand Prix || Bucharest, Romania || Decision (unanimous) || 3 
|-  bgcolor="#FFBBBB"
| 2015-06-19 || Loss ||align=left| Gökhan Gedik || SUPERKOMBAT World Grand Prix || Constanța, Romania || KO (overhand right) || 2 
|-  bgcolor="#CCFFCC" 
| 2015-05-23 || Win ||align=left| Reda Oudgou || SUPERKOMBAT World Grand Prix || Bucharest, Romania || Decision (split) || 3
|-  bgcolor="#FFBBBB"
| 2015-03-07 || Loss ||align=left| Clyde Brunswijk || SUPERKOMBAT World Grand Prix || Ploiești, Romania || Decision (unanimous) || 3
|-  bgcolor="#FFBBBB"
| 2014-06-21 || Loss ||align=left| Moisés Baute || SUPERKOMBAT World Grand Prix, Semi Finals || Constanța, Romania || KO (punch to the body) ||  3
|-  bgcolor="#CCFFCC" 
| 2014-05-24 || Win ||align=left| Christian Brorhilker || SUPERKOMBAT World Grand Prix || Mamaia, Romania || TKO (referee stoppage) || 3
|-  bgcolor="#CCFFCC" 
| 2014-03-29 || Win ||align=left| Romano Romasco || SUPERKOMBAT New Heroes || Ploiești, Romania || KO (right hook) || 2  
|-  bgcolor="#CCFFCC" 
| 2013-12-20 || Win ||align=left| Izidor Bunea || Full Fight || Sfântu Gheorghe, Romania || Decision (unanimous) || 3  
|-  bgcolor="#FFBBBB"
| 2013-11-03 || Loss ||align=left| Fabian Gondorf || SUPERKOMBAT New Heroes || Carrara, Italy || TKO (leg injury) || 3  
|-  bgcolor="#CCFFCC" 
| 2013-09-28 || Win ||align=left| Romelleo da Silva || SUPERKOMBAT World Grand Prix || Botoșani, Romania || Decision (unanimous) || 3  
|-  bgcolor="#CCFFCC" 
| 2013-08-30 || Win ||align=left| Ștefan Szomoru || SUPERKOMBAT New Heroes || Târgoviște, Romania || KO (right hook) || 1  
|-  bgcolor="#FFBBBB"
| 2013-08-03 || Loss ||align=left| Ciprian Șchiopu || Pitbull Challenge || Rădăuți, Romania || Decision || 3  
|-  bgcolor="#FFBBBB"
| 2013-03-02 || Loss ||align=left| Flavius Boiciuc || Respect Gym || Găești, Romania || TKO (referee stoppage) || 3  
|-  bgcolor="#CCFFCC" 
| 2012-12-07 || Win ||align=left| Alexandru Nedelcu || Local Kombat || Onești, Romania || Decision (split) || 3  
|-
! style=background:white colspan=9 |
|-
|-  bgcolor="#CCFFCC"
| 2012-10-05 || Win ||align=left| Mihai Vicențiu || Romanian Xtreme Fighting || Târgoviște, Romania || TKO (referee stoppage) || 1
|-  bgcolor="#CCFFCC"
| 2012-08-15 || Win ||align=left| Izidor Bunea || RFC - Noaptea Campionilor || Uricani, Romania || Decision || 3
|-  bgcolor="#FFBBBB"
| 2012-06-08 || Loss ||align=left| Daniel Alexandru || Local Kombat || Craiova, Romania || TKO (doctor stoppage/eye injury) || 3  
|-  bgcolor="#FFBBBB"
| 2012-03-30 || Loss ||align=left| Alexandru Nedelcu || Local Kombat || Târgu Jiu, Romania || Decision (split) || 3  
|-  bgcolor="#CCFFCC"
| 2012-03-30 || Win ||align=left| Radu Pralea || Local Kombat || Târgu Jiu, Romania || Decision (unanimous) || 3  
|-  bgcolor="#CCFFCC"
| 2011-12-17 || Win ||align=left| Ionuț Jipa || Romanian Xtreme Fighting || Brașov, Romania || TKO (retirement) || 4  
|-  bgcolor="#FFBBBB"
| 2011-09-03 || Loss ||align=left| Sorin Vesa || Challenge Fight || Rieni, Romania || Decision || 3  
|-  bgcolor="#CCFFCC"
| 2011-07-01 || Win ||align=left| Răzvan Popescu || Golden League || Târgoviște, Romania || Decision || 3  
|-
| colspan=9 | Legend:

See also
List of male kickboxers

References

External links
 Cristian Ristea at DFS

1992 births
Living people
Romanian male kickboxers 
Heavyweight kickboxers 
Cruiserweight kickboxers
People from Găești
SUPERKOMBAT kickboxers